Uncompahgre National Forest is a U.S. National Forest covering 955,229 acres (1,492.55 sq mi, or 3,865.68 km2) in (in descending order of land area) parts of Montrose, Mesa, San Miguel, Ouray, Gunnison, Hinsdale, San Juan, and Delta Counties in western Colorado. Its headquarters are in Delta County, in the city of Delta. It borders the San Juan National Forest to the south.

Within the national forest boundaries can be found the arid Uncompahgre Plateau and the northern portion of the San Juan Mountains. The forest contains three alpine wilderness areas: Uncompahgre (formerly the Big Blue Wilderness), Mount Sneffels, and Lizard Head.

Uncompahgre National Forest was established on June 14, 1905. The Uncompahgre, Grand Mesa, and Gunnison National Forests were all administered separately until 1954 when Grand Mesa and Uncompahgre started to be administered as a single unit, with Gunnison added in 1973. Today, Uncompahgre National Forest is administered jointly with the Grand Mesa and Gunnison National Forests from the Forest Supervisor's Office in Delta, Colorado. There are local ranger district offices located in Montrose, Gunnison, and Norwood.

Recreation 
The varied climate, sparse population, and abundance of sun make the Uncompahgre National Forest popular with jeepers, atv'ers, sight seers, and hikers. A common recreational activity within the Forest boundaries is scenic driving, thanks in part to the Million Dollar Highway. Some other local attractions include Trout Lake and Bridal Veil Falls, near Telluride.

There are several dirt roads within the Uncompahgre; some are mining roads left from the 1800s mineral rush, others are occasionally used by the Forest Service. Paved roads include the San Juan Skyway, Alpine Loop, the Unaweep-Tabeguache Scenic and Historic Byway and Owl Creek Pass, which is gravel.

Wilderness areas
There are three officially designated wilderness areas lying within Uncompahgre National Forest that are part of the National Wilderness Preservation System. One of them lies mostly in a neighboring National Forest, while another one extends onto land that is managed by the Bureau of Land Management (as indicated).
 Lizard Head Wilderness (mostly in San Juan NF)
 Mount Sneffels Wilderness
 Uncompahgre Wilderness (partly on BLM land)

See also 

 Grand Mesa Scenic and Historic Byway

References

External links

 Grand Mesa, Uncompahgre and Gunnison National Forests (United States Forest Service)
 GORP
 GORP list of campgrounds

 
National Forests of Colorado
National Forests of the Rocky Mountains
Colorado Western Slope
Protected areas of Gunnison County, Colorado
Protected areas of Hinsdale County, Colorado
Protected areas of Mesa County, Colorado
Protected areas of Montrose County, Colorado
Protected areas of Ouray County, Colorado
Protected areas of San Miguel County, Colorado